Lost It may refer to:

"Lost It", song by Boz Scaggs from Some Change
"Lost It", song by Rich the Kid from The World Is Yours
"Lost It", a song by ska punk band The Hippos from Heads Are Gonna Roll